The Atsugewi are Native Americans residing in northeastern California, United States. Their traditional lands are near Mount Shasta, specifically the Pit River drainage on Burney, Hat, and Dixie Valley or Horse Creeks. They are closely related to the Achomawi and consisted of two groups (the Atsugé and the Apwaruge). The Atsugé ("pine-tree people") traditionally are from the Hat Creek area, and the Apwaruge ("juniper-tree people") are from the Dixie Valley. They lived to the south of the Achomawi.

History
The Atsugewi traditionally lived by hunting and gathering and lived in small groups without centralized political authority. There was a cultural division into two smaller bands, based on the area of habitation. Inhabitants of Hat Creek were known as the "pine tree people" or Atsuge. In turn the residents of Apwariwa or Dixie Valley were known as the "juniper tree people" or Mahuopani; or by the more common Apwaruge, named after the valley itself. Exchanges of gifts and commercial trades were very common between the two bands.

Neighboring cultures

Relations with the nearby Achomawi settlements were varied for both Atsugewi bands. For example interactions between the territoriality adjacent band of Achomawi, the Illmawi, and the Atsuge were generally terse. These bad feelings arose in part from particular Atsuge trespassing upon Illmawi territory while traveling through to collect obsidian from the nearby Glass Mountain.  In general however the Achomawi speaking peoples were the principal trading destination for most Atsugewi manufactured goods and foodstuffs.

Contact between the Achomawi and Atsugewi speakers with the Klamath and Modoc to the north largely wasn't documented. Despite this Garth found it probable that there were extensive interactions between the cultures prior to the adoption of horses by the Northerners. Leslie Spier concluded that the Klamath and their Modoc relatives gained horses in the 1820s. Atsugewi settlements were likely attacked primarily by Modoc. Outsahone was applied to both the Klamath and Modoc peoples. Captured people would be sold into slavery at an intertribal slave market at The Dalles in present-day Oregon.

Atsugewi manufactured bows were prized by the neighboring Klamath, Paiute, Modoc and Achomawi. Called dumidiyi, the bows were of a similar design to those made by the Yurok. The best dumidiyi were made of yew wood by the Atsuge. As fairly peaceable relations developed with Paiute groups by 1870, these yew bows became a common trade item. The visiting Paiute would bring stockpiles of buckskins, red ochre, glass beads, guns, and especially shell currency created from Olivella biplicata shells in central and southern California. In return these trading goods were exchanged for Atsugewi basket and bow goods.

The Tolowa, Shasta, Yurok, Klamath, Atsugewi and groups of Western Mono and Paiute were among those known to have adopted buckskin clothing from the distant Plains Indians. For the Astugewi, this relatively new clothing was called dwákawi. They did not employ a system of consistently smoking the fresh skins. Only buckskins for formal occasions were smoked, leaving daily worn buckskins prone to water damage. The Astugewi potentially did not recognise the water resistance given the smoking process. Garth conjectured that the treating the buckskins with smoke was a recent development, having "a close connection with the introduction of buckskin clothing itself" but lacked direct evidence of this trend.

Culture

Ethnobotany
A full list of Atsugewi plants can be found at http://naeb.brit.org/uses/tribes/19/ (68 documented uses).

Language
The Atsugewi language is a Palaihnihan language. As of 1994, an estimated three people spoke Atsugewi. The majority of the tribe speaks English.

Tribes
Today many Atsugewi are enrolled in the Pit River Tribe, while some Atsugewi people are members of the Susanville Indian Rancheria.

Population

Estimates for the pre-contact populations of most native groups in California have varied substantially. Alfred L. Kroeber estimated the combined 1770 population of the Achumawi and Atsugewi as 3,000. A more detailed analysis by Fred B. Kniffen arrived at the same figure. T. R. Garth (1978:237) estimated the Atsugewi population at a maximum of 850.

Kroeber estimated the combined population of the Achumawi and Atsugewi in 1910 as 1,100. The population was given as about 500 in 1936.

See also
 Atsugewi language
 Atsugewi traditional narratives
 Achomawi

Notes

Bibliography

External links
 Atsugewi, College of the Siskiyous
 , Four Directions Institute
 Atsugewi Bibliography, from California Indian Library Collections Project

Pit River tribes
Native American tribes in California